Seashell of Lisson Grove is one of London's most famous fish and chip restaurants, situated in Lisson Grove in the Marylebone district of London. It has a reputation for serving high quality fresh fish and locally sourced ingredients in both its restaurant and takeaway. It has frequently been voted one of the best places for fish and chips in London.

History
One of the original fish and chip shops, a restaurant in Lisson Grove became a fish bar after the First World War.  It was named the Sea Shell in 1964 and then expanded by John Faulkner in 1971. 

A fire gutted the premises in 2009, leaving only the distinctive flooring behind, but it was reopened after refurbishment in 2010. The Seashell of Lisson Grove has grown to become one of the best known restaurants in the area, visited by local residents, celebrities and politicians.

Reception
Celebrities who have eaten at the restaurant include Halle Berry, Danny DeVito, Ed Sheeran, Bill Nighy, Lady Gaga, Madonna, Dua Lipa, and seven time Michelin star chef Yoshihiro Murata.

See also
 List of fish and chip restaurants

References

External links 
 

Fish and chip restaurants
Restaurants in London